The 2000 COSAFA Cup is the 4th edition of the football tournament that involves teams from COSAFA. Zimbabwe beat Lesotho 3–0 in the final for their first COSAFA Cup title.

First round
Seychelles and Madagascar registered for the tournament following their admission to COSAFA (like Mauritius) but were excluded from participation due to 'budgetary constraints'.

Winners of the first round advanced to the quarter-finals.

Quarter-finals
 Angola (holders), Namibia, Swaziland received byes to the quarter-finals.
 Lesotho also entered as the best losers from the first round (on better disciplinary record compared to Mozambique).

Semi-finals

Final

External links
 Details at RSSSF archives

Cosafa Cup, 2000
COSAFA Cup